Siege of Limerick may refer to:
 Siege of Limerick (1642), English Protestants surrendered to Confederate Catholics
 Siege of Limerick (1650–1651), Confederate Catholics and English Royalists surrendered to English Parliamentary forces 
 Siege of Limerick (1690), Jacobites withstood Williamites
 Siege of Limerick (1691), Jacobites surrendered to Williamites
 Battle of Limerick, Irish republican Irregulars surrendered to Irish Free State forces